Dancho is both a surname and a given name. Notable people with the name include:

Raquel Dancho (born 1990), Canadian politician
Dancho Yordanov (born 1958), Bulgarian gymnast